Elvin Yunuszade (born 22 August 1992 in Qazakh) is an Azerbaijani footballer who last played for Keşla in the Azerbaijan Premier League.

Career

Club
On 24 May 2018, Qarabağ FK announced that Yunuszade had been released by the club following expiration of his contract.

On 9 January 2019, Sabail announced the singing of Yunuszade. On 21 December 2019, Yunuszade left Sabail by mutual consent.

On 9 February 2020, Yunuszade signed contract with NK Čelik Zenica until the end of the 2019–20 season.

On 10 August 2020, Yunuszade signed contract with KF Shkupi until the end of the 2020–21 season.

International
Yunuszade made his debut for the senior national team of his country on 5 March 2014, scoring the winning goal in the 1:0 victory over Philippines in a friendly match.

Career statistics

Club

International

Statistics accurate as of match played 16 November 2014

International goal
Scores and results list Azerbaijan's goal tally first.

Honours
Neftchi Baku
Azerbaijan Premier League (2): 2011–12, 2012–13
Azerbaijan Cup (1): 2012–13

Qarabağ
Azerbaijan Premier League (3): 2015–16, 2016–17, 2017–18
Azerbaijan Cup: (1) 2015-16

References

External links
 nkcelik.ba
 
 

1992 births
Living people
People from Qazax
Association football defenders
Azerbaijani footballers
Azerbaijani expatriate footballers
Azerbaijan Premier League players
Premier League of Bosnia and Herzegovina players
Expatriate footballers in Bosnia and Herzegovina
Macedonian First Football League players
Expatriate footballers in North Macedonia
Simurq PIK players
Qarabağ FK players
Neftçi PFK players
Sabah FC (Azerbaijan) players
Sabail FK players
NK Čelik Zenica players
FK Shkupi players
Azerbaijan under-21 international footballers
Azerbaijan international footballers